Geir Olav Henæs (born 3 September 1955) is a former Norwegian footballer. He played as a striker.

In the period 1977–1988 he played 227 games and scored 78 goals for Moss FK in the Norwegian Premier League. He played three international games for Norway and one game for Norway U-21, all in 1979.

References

1955 births
Living people
Norwegian footballers
Moss FK players
Norway international footballers
Eliteserien players
Association football forwards